Tõnu Viik may refer to:
 Tõnu Viik (astronomer) (1939–), Estonian astronomer
 Tõnu Viik (philosopher)  (1968–), Estonian philosopher